Lalitha Sivakumar is a Carnatic music teacher and composer. She was known for vocally accompanying her mother-in-law and leading Carnatic vocalist, the late D. K. Pattammal, in concerts,. Lalitha Sivakumar is also prominently known as the mother and guru of Nithyashree Mahadevan, a vocalist in Indian music. She is a well known veteran guru (teacher) of the D.K.P's school of Carnatic Music.

Early life
Lalitha Sivakumar's father, Palghat Mani Iyer, was a mridangist in the field of Carnatic music, and was the first mridangist to win the Sangeetha Kalanidhi and Padmabhushan awards. At the age of 18, Lalitha Sivakumar was married to I. Sivakumar, son of D. K. Pattammal. The day after the wedding, she received training in Carnatic music from D. K. Pattammal.

Career
Shortly thereafter, both as a solo performer and as a musician accompanying D. K. Pattammal, she received praise from several other leading Carnatic vocalists including D. K. Jayaraman, K. V. Narayanaswamy and M. S. Subbulakshmi. However, her career as a solo performer was brief, and she remained content vocally accompanying her guru.

Lalitha Sivakumar has composed, and set music to a number of kritis, tillanas, and bhajans, in a variety of Indian languages.

Several Organisations have recognised Smt.Lalitha Sivakumar's talent and contributions to the world of Carnatic music. Recently, On Recognising that A Musical Legacy continues, Madras South Lions Charitable Trust & RASA - A.R.P.I.T.A - Academy for Research & Performance of Indian Theatre Arts, together conferred the title 'ISAI RASA MAAMANI' on Smt.Lalitha & I.Sivakumar, on 4 January 2016.

The life of Lalitha Sivakumar as a teacher is a stunning success. The D.K.P's school of Carnatic Music is led by Lalitha Sivakumar. Comparatively, this school is said to have a huge number of learners widespread everywhere across the globe. Most of the students from this school are said to have become performing artists. Also there are a good number of students who learnt from her and has become good teachers in many parts of the world. She is considered to be a veteran teacher in this field and is sending forward the musical legacy of D.K.P to several students worldwide. Her way of teaching is said to be unique and authentic, adhering to various principles of this classical music and languages, and at the same time making an allowance among the learners for brilliant improvisation, walking through the classical limits easily. Her emphasise on adhering to the principles of Carnatic Music, developed over a period of time by many eminent doyens, her emphasise on language, makes the school well known for its pronunciation and presentation skills of its performers.

Lalitha Sivakumar has given Advanced Carnatic Vocal Training to the students directly and also virtually for students away from India. Other than Dr.Nithyasree Mahadevan, Lalitha Sivakumar's disciples also include Lavanya Sundararaman (her granddaughter), Dr.Niranjana Srinivasan, Pallavi Prasanna, Nalini Krishnan, Maharajapuram Srinivasan, Dr. Periyasamy and several others.

As a testimony to her music knowledge, Smt. Lalitha Sivakumar is the most preferred judge for several Carnatic Music competitions and Devotional Music competitions held throughout the year in India.

Notes

Living people
Performers of Hindu music
Indian women classical musicians
Carnatic musicians
Indian music educators
Women educators from Tamil Nadu
Educators from Tamil Nadu
20th-century Indian educators
Year of birth missing (living people)
Women musicians from Tamil Nadu
20th-century Indian composers
20th-century Indian women musicians
Women music educators
20th-century women composers
20th-century women educators